Chispita (English: little spark) may refer to:

 Chispita (TV series), a Mexican telenovela
 Chispita (album), the soundtrack album to the TV series
 "Chsipita" (song), from the soundtrack album

See also 
 Chispitas mariposa, a brand of sparklers